Anatona is a genus of beetles belonging to the family Scarabaeidae.

Species
 Anatona alboguttata Burmeister, 1842
 Anatona castanoptera Burmeister, 1842
 Anatona selousi Janson, 1917
 Anatona stillata (Newman, 1838)

Cetoniinae